Angelo Zucca (born 26 December 1955) is an Italian gymnast. He competed in seven events at the 1976 Summer Olympics.

References

External links
 

1955 births
Living people
Italian male artistic gymnasts
Olympic gymnasts of Italy
Gymnasts at the 1976 Summer Olympics
Sportspeople from Cagliari